Alister Millar "Jock" Allan (born 28 January 1944) is an Olympic medal-winning Scottish rifleman who represented Great Britain at five Olympics between 1968 and 1992 (1972 and 1980 excepted).

His best performance was at the 50m Rifle Three Positions when he set an Olympic record during qualifying and came second to countryman (and defending champion) Malcolm Cooper in the final.

References

External links

1944 births
Living people
Olympic shooters of Great Britain
Scottish male sport shooters
British male sport shooters
ISSF rifle shooters
Shooters at the 1968 Summer Olympics
Shooters at the 1976 Summer Olympics
Shooters at the 1984 Summer Olympics
Shooters at the 1988 Summer Olympics
Shooters at the 1992 Summer Olympics
Olympic silver medallists for Great Britain
Olympic bronze medallists for Great Britain
Sportspeople from Fife
Olympic medalists in shooting
Scottish Olympic medallists
Commonwealth Games gold medallists for Scotland
Commonwealth Games silver medallists for Scotland
Commonwealth Games bronze medallists for Scotland
Shooters at the 1974 British Commonwealth Games
Shooters at the 1978 Commonwealth Games
Shooters at the 1982 Commonwealth Games
Shooters at the 1986 Commonwealth Games
Shooters at the 1990 Commonwealth Games
Shooters at the 1994 Commonwealth Games
Medalists at the 1984 Summer Olympics
Medalists at the 1988 Summer Olympics
Commonwealth Games medallists in shooting
Medallists at the 1974 British Commonwealth Games
Medallists at the 1978 Commonwealth Games
Medallists at the 1982 Commonwealth Games
Medallists at the 1986 Commonwealth Games
Medallists at the 1994 Commonwealth Games